Ampelocera longissima is a species of plant in the Ulmaceae family. It is endemic to Ecuador.

Its natural habitats are subtropical or tropical moist lowland forests and subtropical or tropical moist montane forests.

References

longissima
Endemic flora of Ecuador
Near threatened plants
Taxonomy articles created by Polbot